Película (Spanish for a film; thin layer of any material) is a Spanish film festival held every October by the Instituto Cervantes de Manila, in collaboration with the Embassy of Spain to the Philippines. Created in 2002, this event shows award-winning Spanish and Latin American films.

Due to the Película's yearly success, the festival made big changes during its eighth season in 2009. The duration of the festival was lengthened, and the number of venues was increased from one to three venues to accommodate more films. The festival's venues include the Cultural Center of the Philippines (CCP), Greenbelt Cinemas, and the De La Salle- College of Saint Benilde School of Design and Arts.

Aside from film screenings, supplementary cultural events were also organized based on the yearly theme of the festival. Photographic exhibits, cinema workshops, music and dance performances add color to the film festival. These events do not only showcase the classical and contemporary Spanish culture to the Filipinos, but they also create a bridge between the Filipino and Spanish cultures. Past events include Oscar F. Orengo's photographic exhibit of portraits of fort-four of the Philippines' greatest film directors, seminars on film directing by Max Lemcke and OScar Cardenas, and performances by Spain's leading vertical dance company called B612, award-winning flamenco guitarist Oscar Herrero, and piano and violin duet named Duo Rivera, just to name a few.

Movies Featured in Película

Season 1 (2002): Bwana, El abuelo, Goya en Burdeos, La ardilla roja, Retrato de mujer con hombre al fondo, Solas, Tesis

Season 2 (2003): El Bola, En construcción, El último viaje de Robert Rylands, It's for you, La comunidad, Martin (Hache), Silvia Prieto, Sin verguenza.

Season 3 (2004): 800 Balas, Ana y los otros, Días de fútbol, El caballero Don Quijote, El juego de la silla, En la ciudad, En la ciudad sin limites, El viaje de Carol, Historias minimas, La caja 507, El otro lado de la cama, La primera noche, Smoking_room, Suite Habana.

Season 4 (2005): Abre los ojos, Astronautas, Barrio, Ferpect crime, Dias contados, El abrazo partido, El Bola, El bosque animado, El juego de la verdad, Extranjeras, Hector, Intacto, La buena estrella, La flaqueza del bolchevique, La ley de Herodes, Los lunes al sol, Mar adentro, Nadie hablará de nosotras cuando hayamos muerto, Noviembre, Planta cuarta, Sodlados de Salamina, Subterra, Take my eyes, Tesis, All about my mother, Torremolinos 73.

Season 5 (2006): Amor idiota, El abuelo, El calentito, El método, El milagro de candeal, Elsa & Fred, El séptimo día, Frio sol de invierno, Historia de un beso, Iberia, Machuca, Ninette, No sos vos soy yo, Perder es cuestion del método, Piedras, Princesas, Round two, Seres queridos, Tapas, Tiovivo C. 1950, My quick way out, You're the one.

Season 6 (2007): 7 Virgenes, Azul oscuro casi negro, Ciudad en celo, De profundis, Derecho de familia, El aura, El próximo Oriente, El sueño de una noche de San Juan, Habana Blues, Iluminados por el fuego, Invisibles, La noche de los girasoles, La educación de las hadas, La vida secreta de las palabras, Los últimos de Filipinas, Otros días vendrán, Salvador, Semen, Utopía, Viva Cuba!, You're life in 65

Season 7 (2008): Bajo las estrellas, Concursante, El pollo, el pez y el cangrejo real, El violín, Fados, Fuera de carta, La Caja, La torre de Suso, Lo mejor de mi, Luz silenciosa, Mataharis, Miguel y William, Nocturna, El Orfanato, Siete mesas de billar francés, The Oxford murders, Todos estamos invitados, Yo soy la Juani.

Season 8 (2009): El lince perdido, El sueño de una noche de San Juan, La zona, Forasters, Una palabra tuya, Los girasoles ciegos, Casual day, 53 días de Invierno, El truco de Manco, Caótica Ana, La buena nueva, La buena vida, Retorno a Hansala, Chuecatown, No me pidas que te bese porque te besaré, El nido vacio, Solo quiero caminar, Dieta mediterranea, Audience choice, 14 kilómetros, Los cronocrimenes, 3 días, Tamaraw Quest, Medalawna, Lucio, Bucarest, Walai, Ang Pasko ni Intoy, Cine > Sine, Flores de Luna, Syokoy, Imelda, Walking the waking journey, Tapologo, The last journey of Ninoy, Extranjeras, Rabia, El Baño del Papa, Parpados azules, La punta del diablo, Una novia errante, Astronautas, Los amantes del circulo polar, Amanece, que no es poco, Los santos inocentes, Bienvenido, Mr. Marshall, Viridiana, El espíritu de la colmena, Átame, Astronautas.

Season 9 (2010): Bolívia, Cachimba, Luna de Avellaneda, El cielo abierto, El secreto de sus ojos, Lo que sé de Lola, Garbo: the spy, happyland, Ich Bin Enric Marco, La leyenda del tiempo, La mujer sin piano, El chacotero sentimental, Los condenados, Manolito Gafotas, Nacidas para sufrir, Otilia Rauda, que Se mueren los feos, rencor, tres días con la familia, Celda 211, Desierto adentro, La teta asustada, Pantaleón y las visitadoras

Season 10 (2011) El secreto de sus ojos, Mar adentro, Fuera de carta, Lope, La zona, La vergüenza, Mal día para pescar, Buried, Mil cretinos, La vida secreta de las palabras, En la ciudad sin límites, The Great Vazquez, Gordos, Primos, Todas las canciones hablan de mí, Bíutiful, Yo también, Elsa y Fred, También la lluvia, Amador, Viridiana, Chico y Rita, Morirse está en hebreo, Buenas noches España, Habitación en Roma, Didí Hollywood

Season 11 (2012) Donde el olor del mar no llega, Un cuento chino, Dos hermanos, Arrugas, No habrá paz para los malvados, Grupo 7, After, Mientras duermes, Katmandú, Madrid, 1987, Lo mejor de Eva, Pa negre, La chispa de la vida, 5 metros cuadrados, 18 comidas, 80 egunean, María y yo, Hollywood Talkies, Jacques Leonard, el payo Chac.

Season 12 (2013) Blancanieves, El artista y la modelo, La maleta mexicana, De tu ventana a la mía, Colgados de un sueño, ¡Atraco!, O Apostolo, A puerta fría, Promoción fantasma, Extraterrestre, Copito de nieve, Días de vinilo, Samurai, Días de pesca en Patagonia, La última película, Aquel no era yo, Cortos de Zamboanga, Cortos valencianos.

Season 13 (2014) 10.000 noches en ninguna parte, 2 francos, 40 pesetas, Azul intangible, Bertsolari, Bypass, Caníbal, Espantapájaros, Implacable, La cebra, La gran familia española, La revolución de Juan Escopeta, La vida inesperada, Las aventuras de Tadeo Jones, Las brujas de Zugarramurdi, Madrid, 1987, Mapa, Soldados de Salamina, Todas las mujeres, Vivir es fácil con los ojos cerrados, A political story, Cólera, Democracia, Hotzanak, for your own safety, Zela Trovke.

Season 14 (2015) Stockholm, Negociador, La isla mínima, Paco de Lucía: La búsqueda, Tres bodas de más, La plaga, Loreak, Hermosa juventud, Ocho apellidos vascos, Ártico, El árbol magnético, Todos están muertos, Cortos de España, Aquellas palabras, De aliados a masacrados, Relatos salvajes, Gente en sitios, Milagro en Praga, El resto del mundo.

Audience Choice Award 
The Película Choice Award was created in 2004.

These are the awarded films in the previous editions:

2004 Audience choice award En la ciudad sin límites (Antonio Hernández, 2003)

2005 Audience choice award Mar adentro (Alejandro Amenábar, 2004)

2006 Audience choice award Elsa y Fred (Marcos Carnevale, 2005)

2007 Audience choice award La vida secreta de las palabras (Isabel Coixet, 2005)

2008 Audience choice award Fuera de carta (Nacho G. Velilla, 2008)

2009 Audience choice award La zona (Rodrigo Plá, 2007)

2010 Audience choice award El secreto de sus ojos (Juan José Campanella, 2009)

2011 Audience choice award También la lluvia (Icíar Bollaín, 2010)

2012 Audience choice award Un cuento chino (Sebastián Borensztein, 2011)

2013 Audience choice award Días de vinilo (Gabriel Nesci, 2012)

2014 Audience choice award La gran familia española (Daniel Sánchez Arévalo, 2013)

2015 Audience choice award Relatos salvajes (Damián Szifron, 2014)

References

External links
 Instituto Cervantes de Manila
 Pelicula Facebook Page
 
 

Film festivals in the Philippines
Events in Metro Manila